Magnetoelectrochemistry is a branch of electrochemistry dealing with magnetic effects in electrochemistry.

History
These effects have been supposed to exist since the time of Michael Faraday.
There have also been observations on the existence of Hall effect in electrolytes. Until these observations, magnetoelectrochemistry was an esoteric curiosity, though
this field has had a rapid development in the past years and is now an active area of research. Other scientific fields which contributed to the development of magnetoelectrochemistry are magnetohydrodynamics and convective diffusion theory.

Effects of magnetic field
There are three types of magnetic effects in electrochemistry:
 on electrolytes
 on mass transfer
 on metal deposition

Notes

See also
Electrochemical engineering
Magnetochemistry
Electrochemical energy conversion
Magnetic mineralogy
Magnetohydrodynamics

External links

Encyclopedia of Electrochemistry
Magnetoelectrochem
HZDR
TU Dresden

Electrochemistry